Vinco may refer to:

Vinco, Pennsylvania, a community in Jackson Township, Cambria County, Pennsylvania, USA
Vinco Corporation, a Detroit, Michigan-based manufacturer
Ivo Vinco (1927–2014), Italian opera singer

See also 
 Vinko (disambiguation)